Slipped disc is most frequently used as an informal and misleading name for the medical condition known as spinal disc herniation (prolapsus disci intervertebralis).

 While the spelling with a "c" is proper in anatomy, it is often spelled with a "k" (disk) in other situations.

It can also refer to the following:
 A composition by the Benny Goodman Sextet or the 1945 album on which it appears
 A song by Luke Vibert
 A 1965 episode of The Donna Reed Show
 An episode of Snoops, also known as "The Stolen Diskette"
 Slipped Disc Records, former record label of rock band Ten Hands
 Slipped Disc Records, a now-defunct yet very important record store in Valley Stream, New York
 A pseudonym for blogger and director Jason Scott Sadofsky, who is referred to as "The Slipped Disk".
 The English music writer Norman Lebrecht's blog